Titarwala is a village in Dausa district, Rajasthan, India.

References
http://offerings.nic.in/directory/adminreps/viewpansum.asp?selstate=97&pno=5&ptype=V&parenttype=D

Villages in Dausa district